Jacques Valax (born August 23, 1951 in Albi, Tarn) is a member of the National Assembly of France.  He represents the Tarn department,  and is a member of the Socialiste, radical, citoyen et divers gauche.

References

1951 births
Living people
People from Albi
Socialist Party (France) politicians
Deputies of the 13th National Assembly of the French Fifth Republic
Deputies of the 14th National Assembly of the French Fifth Republic
Politicians from Occitania (administrative region)